Alexander Slafkovský (born 11 March 1983) is a Slovak slalom canoeist who has competed at the international level since 1998.

Slafkovský won 15 medals at the ICF Canoe Slalom World Championships with ten golds (C1 team: 2003, 2009, 2010, 2011, 2013, 2014, 2015, 2017, 2018, 2019), five silvers (C1: 2013, 2017, 2021, 2022, C1 team: 2022) and one bronze (C1 team: 2021).

At the European Championships he won a total of 21 medals (12 golds, 6 silvers and 3 bronzes). Slafkovský also won the overall World Cup title in the C1 class in 2012, 2016 and 2018. He finished the 2017 season as the World No. 1 in the C1 event.

His father Alexander Slafkovský is a former mayor of Liptovský Mikuláš.

World Cup individual podiums

1 European Championship counting for World Cup points
2 Oceania Championship counting for World Cup points

References

12 September 2009 final results of the men's C1 team slalom event for the 2009 ICF Canoe Slalom World Championships. – accessed 12 September 2009.
2010 ICF Canoe Slalom World Championships 12 September 2010 C1 men's final results – accessed 12 September 2010.
ICF medalists for Olympic and World Championships – Part 2: rest of flatwater (now sprint) and remaining canoeing disciplines: 1936–2007.

External links

Living people
Slovak male canoeists
1983 births
Sportspeople from Liptovský Mikuláš
Medalists at the ICF Canoe Slalom World Championships